The 2020 Oregon State Senate election was held on Tuesday, November 3, 2020, with the primary election being held on May 19, 2020. Voters in 16 of the 30 Oregon State Senate districts elected their state senators. The elections coincided with the elections for other offices, including for U.S. President.

The Democratic Party kept their majority. The Oregon State Senate does not have term limits.

Background 
Democrats have held the Oregon Senate since 2002 and the chamber was not considered competitive in 2020.

Electoral System 
Each members of the Oregon State Senate are elected from single-member districts by first-past-the-post voting to four-year terms with staggered elections. Contested nominations of the Democratic and Republican parties for each district were determined by an open primary election. Minor-party and independent candidates were nominated by petition and write-in candidates had to file a request with the Secretary of State's office for votes for them to be counted.

Predictions

Results summary

Close races
Districts where the margin of victory was under 10%:
 (gain)

 (gain)

Results by district

1st District

2nd District

5th District

9th District

10th District (special)

12th District

14th District

18th District

21st District

22nd District

23rd District

25th District

27th District

28th District

29th District

30th District

See also 

 2020 Oregon House of Representatives election

References

External links
 
 
  (State affiliate of the U.S. League of Women Voters)
 

State Senate
Oregon Senate
2020